Benga is a genre of Kenyan popular music.  It evolved between the late 1940s and late 1960s, in Kenya's capital city of Nairobi.  In the 1940s, the African Broadcasting Service in Nairobi aired a steady stream of soukous, South African kwela, Congolese finger-style guitar and various kinds of Cuban dance music that heavily influenced emergence of benga.  There were also popular folk songs of Kenya's Luo peoples that formed the base on benga creation.

Luo Benga 

The Luo of Kenya have long played an eight-string lyre called nyatiti, and guitarists from the area sought to imitate the instrument's syncopated melodies. In benga, the electric bass guitar is played in a style reminiscent of the nyatiti. As late as the turn of the twentieth century, this bass in nyatiti supported the rhythm essential in transmitting knowledge about society through music. Opondo Owenga of Gem Yala, the grandfather of Odhiambo Siangla, was known for employing music as a means of teaching the history of the Luo. The father of the popular Luo Benga is non-other than The Famous George Ramogi (Omogi Wuod Weta) and CK Jazz. He helped the Benga enthusiasts by recording their Benga music in different labels in the capital city of Nairobi. Dr. Mengo of Victoria Jazz was a protege of George Ramogi.

In 1967, the first major benga band, Shirati Jazz, was formed by Daniel Owino Misiani (22 February 1940 – 17 May 2006). The group launched a string of hits that were East Africa's biggest songs throughout the 1970s and 1980s. Shirati Jazz's biggest rival was Victoria Jazz, formed in 1972 by Ochieng Nelly Mengo and Collela Mazee. Despite many personnel changes, Victoria Jazz remained popular throughout the 1970s, when the Voice of Kenya radio station pushed an onslaught of East African pop. Victoria C Band of Awino Lawi was one of the splinter group of Victoria Jazz.

1997 saw the death of three prominent Luo Benga artist, Okatch Biggy of Heka Heka Band, George Ramogi and Prince Jully. The Jolly Boys Band of Prince Jully was taken over by his wife Princess Jully and she has since been a leading female Benga musician.

Another famous benga band Migori Super Stars was formed in the mid-70s and was led by Musa Olwete which later split to form another popular benga band Migori Super Stars C with musicians such as Joseph Ochola (Kasongo Polo Menyo), Onyango Jamba, Ochieng' Denge denge and others.

More modern benga artists include Kapere Jazz Band and the rootsy Ogwang Lelo Okoth. The new millennium has seen the emergence of Dola Kabarry and Musa Juma. The latter saw his career cut short as he died in 2011. MJ, as he was popularly known to his fans, developed a kind of benga that infused elements of rumba. he was able to mold other musicians such as John Junior, Ogonji, Madanji, and his late brother Omondi Tonny.

There are also other benga artists based in other countries other than Kenya, such as the American/Kenyan group Extra Golden.

See also
 Chandarana Records

References

Kenyan styles of music
African popular music